The Lendu language is a Central Sudanic language spoken by the Balendru, an ethno-linguistic agriculturalist group residing in eastern Democratic Republic of the Congo in the area west and northwest of Lake Albert, specifically the Ituri Region of Orientale Province. It is one of the most populous of the Central Sudanic languages.  There are three-quarters of a million Lendu speakers in the DRC. A conflict between the Lendu was the basis of the Ituri conflict.

Besides the Balendru, Lendu is spoken as a native language by a portion of the Hema, Alur, and Okebu.

Names
Ethnologue gives Bbadha as an alternate name of Lendu, but Blench (2000) lists Badha as a distinct language. A draft listing of Nilo-Saharan languages, available from his website and dated 2012, lists Lendu/Badha.

Phonology
Demolin (1995) posits that Lendu has voiceless implosives, . However, Goyvaerts (1988) had described these as creaky-voiced implosives , as in Hausa, contrasting with a series of modally voiced implosives  as in Kalabari, and Ladefoged judges that this seems to be a more accurate description.

References

Central Sudanic languages
Languages of the Democratic Republic of the Congo
Ethnic groups in the Democratic Republic of the Congo